The Godbeites were members of the Godbeite Church, officially called the  Church of Zion, organized in 1870 by William S. Godbe. This dissident offshoot of the Church of Jesus Christ of Latter-day Saints was aimed toward embracing all belief systems. Known for embracing spiritualism and mysticism, the church died out by the 1880s.

In 1868, Godbe and other Mormon merchants began criticizing the economic demands and policies of Brigham Young in Utah Magazine, a periodical that would eventually become The Salt Lake Tribune. Godbe and several other proponents were excommunicated from the church on October 25, 1869. Godbe wanted to reform the LDS Church and believed that political reform, breaking Young's control over secular matters in the territory, could help spur religious reform.

The Godbeites were the original core of Utah Territory's Liberal Party. However, as it became more explicitly anti-Mormon and critical of polygamy, the Godbeite influence in the party died out.

Notes

References
.
.
 

 
1880s disestablishments
Defunct Latter Day Saint denominations
Latter Day Saint movement in Utah
Liberal Mormon denominations in the Latter Day Saint movement
Organizations based in Utah
Religious organizations established in 1870